Andrea Hlaváčková and Peng Shuai were the defending champions, but Peng chose not to participate and Hlaváčková chose to compete in s'Hertogenbosch instead.

Monique Adamczak and Storm Sanders won the title, defeating Jocelyn Rae and Laura Robson in the final, 6–4, 4–6, [10–4].

Seeds

Draw

Draw

References 
 Main draw

Nottingham Open - Doubles
Nottingham Open
2017 Nottingham Open